The list of ship commissionings in 1933 includes a chronological list of all ships commissioned in 1933.


References 

1933